Methkal Marouf Abu Drais (born 29 December 1983) is a Jordanian long-distance runner. He was born in Alardah. Abu Drais won the 2012 Stockholm Marathon in a time of 2:19:16 hours. He competed in the marathon at the 2012 Summer Olympics in London and finished in 56th place.

Methkal competed in the Marathon at the 2016 Summer Olympics but he did not fare very well being the last finisher in 140th place.

References

External links

1983 births
Living people
Jordanian male long-distance runners
Athletes (track and field) at the 2012 Summer Olympics
Olympic athletes of Jordan
Jordanian male cross country runners
Jordanian male marathon runners
Olympic male marathon runners